Upton House is a country house in the grounds of Upton Country Park on the northwestern shoreline of Holes Bay in the county of Dorset on the south coast of England. It is owned by BCP Council.

History 
The land on which Upton House stands was acquired by William Spurrier, four times Mayor of Poole. The house itself was built by his son, Christopher, between 1816 and 1818 and its west wing was added in 1825.

The Spurriers had built their wealth on the Newfoundland trade, but this went into decline and this, coupled with Christopher Spurrier's gambling and extravagance, force him to sell the property in 1828 to Sir Edward Doughty, a member of the Tichborne family. Upton House remained with the barons of Tichborne until 1901 when, as a result of massive debts, they sold it on to the Llewellins who held it until 1957, when William Llewellin bequeathed the estate to Poole Corporation (now BCP Council). The council looked at various options to fund its upkeep including plans for a zoo, hospital or golf course. For several years it was rented to Prince Carol of Romania. In 1976 it was decided that, based on public opinion, the estate would be opened that year as a country park and leisure facility for the people of Poole. Following restoration, the house was also opened to the public in 1981.

In 2015, Upton Country Park became part of the newly established Holes Bay Nature Park.

House 
Upton House is a Georgian mansion and Grade II* listed building.

Park 
The country park comprises over 130 acres of parkland, shoreline and formal gardens. Admission is free and the park is open daily from 8 am until 6 pm.

The park is a trailhead for the Poole Heritage Cycle Route.

Every Saturday morning at 9am Upton House hosts parkrun, a free, five kilometre, timed event, around the grounds of Upton House. Assembly is at 8:50am outside the tea rooms.

Pergins Island 
The estate also includes Pergins Island in Holes Bay.

References

External links 
 Upton Country Park official website.

Country houses in Dorset
Poole Harbour
Tourist attractions in Poole